Börnecke is a village in the northern Harz Foreland in the central German district of Harz in Saxony-Anhalt. Since 1993 it is part of the town Blankenburg (Harz).

Sources 
 1000 Jahre Börnecke, Hrsg. Arbeitsgruppe Chronik, 2006
  Blankenburg in Vergangenheit und Gegenwart, Hrsg. Ortsleitung der SED und Rat der Stadt Blankenburg, 1979
 Lebenswege - Archäologie an der B 6n - Begleitheft zur Sonderausstellung im Schlossmuseum Quedlinburg, Hrsg. Harald Meller, 2005

External links 
 Börnecke (Harz) Official internet page for Börnecke

References 

Former municipalities in Saxony-Anhalt
Blankenburg (Harz)
Harz (district)
Duchy of Brunswick